Grace, Lady Manners ( – ) was an English noblewoman who lived at Haddon Hall near Bakewell, Derbyshire. She founded Bakewell's Lady Manners School in 1636.

Biography
Grace Pierrepont was the daughter of Sir Henry Pierrepont, a Knight of the Garter, and Frances Cavendish. Her maternal grandparents were Sir William Cavendish and Bess of Hardwick. Grace's brother was Robert Pierrepont, born in 1584, who became the 1st Earl of Kingston-upon-Hull. Grace's sister, Elizabeth, married Thomas Erskine, 1st Earl of Kellie.

On 1 August 1593 Grace was married to Sir George Manners (1569-1623) of Haddon Hall in Derbyshire,  a Member of Parliament. According to the inscription in Bakewell Church, she had nine children, including:
John Manners, 8th Earl of Rutland (1604-1679)
Elizabeth Manners, who married Robert Sutton, 1st Baron Lexinton
Eleanor Manners, who married Lewis Watson, 1st Baron Rockingham, and had children
Frances Manners (died 1652), who married Nicholas Saunderson, 2nd Viscount Castleton, and had children
Dorothy Manners, who married Sir Thomas Lake

On 20 May 1636, she founded Lady Manners School in Bakewell, Derbyshire.

Her body is interred in Bakewell Parish Church.

References

Founders of educational institutions
People from Bakewell
Year of death missing
Grace
17th-century English women
Year of birth uncertain